Robert Bennett (born 29 December 1951) is an English former footballer who played as a forward in the Football League for Southend United and Scunthorpe United, and in non-league football for Staines Town, Wimbledon, Harrow Borough, Northwood, Hayes, Molesey and Ruislip.

References

1951 births
Living people
Footballers from Harrow, London
English footballers
Association football forwards
Staines Town F.C. players
Southend United F.C. players
Scunthorpe United F.C. players
Wimbledon F.C. players
Harrow Borough F.C. players
Northwood F.C. players
Hayes F.C. players
Molesey F.C. players
Ruislip F.C. players
English Football League players